AD 19 (XIX) was a common year starting on Sunday (link will display the full calendar) of the Julian calendar. At the time, it was known as the Year of the Consulship of Silanus and Balbus (or, less frequently, year 772 Ab urbe condita). The denomination AD 19 for this year has been used since the early medieval period, when the Anno Domini calendar era became the prevalent method in Europe for naming years.

Events

By place

Roman Empire 
 Maroboduus, king of the Marcomanni, is deposed by Catualda.  This ends the threat to the Romans from Germanic tribes until the reign of Marcus Aurelius. Rome places them under its protection.
 Germanicus Julius Caesar, commander in chief of the Roman legions in the East and beloved by the legionaries, falls ill and dies. On his deathbed he accuses Gnaeus Calpurnius Piso, the governor of Syria, of poisoning him.  
 Emperor Tiberius expels the Egyptians from Rome, and deports 4,000 Jews from Sicily.
 Agrippina the Elder accuses Gnaeus Calpurnius Piso of having assassinated her husband Germanicus Julius Caesar in Antioch. However, there is no credible evidence and the charge is never proven. (In ancient times, when medical science was not advanced, poison was usually suspected whenever a young, healthy person died suddenly. There was no way to pinpoint and trace the substance after death; therefore, it was considered a quick, easy and non-traceable form of homicide.)  
 A triumphal arch is built for Germanicus Julius Caesar in Saintes.

Parthia 
 King Vonones I is removed to Cilicia and kept under house arrest. He escapes, but is caught and killed by a retired Roman legion veteran.

Asia 
 Last year (6th) of Tianfeng era of the Chinese Xin Dynasty.
 First flying machine, according to the Hanshu.
 Gondophares becomes king of the Saces.

Births 
 October 10 – Tiberius Gemellus, grandson of Tiberius (d. c. 38 AD)

Deaths 
 October 10 – Germanicus, Roman general (b. 15 BC)
 Cotys III (or Cotys VIII), Roman client king of Thrace
 Vonones I, king of the Parthian Empire

References 

0019

als:10er#19